Oreamnos is a genus of North American caprines. The mountain goat (Oreamnos americanus) is the only living species. Until the end of the Pleistocene, another species, Oreamnos harringtoni, was distributed to the south of the recent form.

References

Caprids
Mammal genera
Mammal genera with one living species
Taxa named by Constantine Samuel Rafinesque